The Craigavon Cowboys are an American football team playing in Craigavon, currently playing in the Irish American Football League. Early success for the Cowboys seen them take home the Shamrock Bowl Crown in 1986, 1990 and 1992. The Club folded in the mid 90s but reformed again in 2005, winning the DV8 League in 2009 - the DV8 league was set up for young clubs giving them the base to slowly grow their team and to give the rookie players some valuable game time. After winning the DV8 championship the Cowboys jumped up to the top division in Ireland.

2010 season
In the 2010 season, the Cowboys finished 4–4 and were close to clinching a play-off berth going down to the last game of the season.

2011 season
Season 2011 saw a marked improvement, with the team going 4–4 again but going through via the Wildcard Game, in which they beat Belfast Trojans, 17–14. That meant a visit to Limerick to take on the Vikings in their own patch, and although it was a close-fought game, Cowboys lost 21–8.

2012 season
Season 2012 was one which started out with a lot of excitement and enthusiasm but a poor start put that to bed and Cowboys ended with a record of 2–6, their poorest since re-forming and joining IAFL in 2010.

2013 season
Season 2013 was another season of disappointment that promised so much, a tough opener against defending champions Belfast Trojans saw the Cowboys struggle to a 46–13 loss. The 'Boys got their one and only win in a 23–0 romp at home to West Dublin Rhinosin their third game and narrowly lost 0–7 away to the same side. Cowboys where close to ending the season on a high at home to Carrick Knights but a last-minute missed field goal saw the game end in an 18–18 draw. A disappointing season ended with a 1–6–1 record.

2014 season
A slightly improved 2014 season seen the Cowboys move to Chambers Park, Portadown and while the end results where disappointing with a 2–6 record, the 'Boys where within a score from defeating the visiting Dublin Rebels and Trinity College Dublin.

2015 season
Season 2015 saw the Cowboys finally make a return SBC Playoffs with a 3–5 record, etching wins against South Dublin Panthers, West Dublin Rhinos and Carrickfergus Knights. The Knights game will be remembered for one of the most dramatic comebacks in IAFL history, the Knights where leading 22–0 with 5.21 left on the clock before the Cowboys mounted a stirring comeback, scored a Touchdown with the final play to tie the game 22-22 and Luis Alberto slotting over the XP to take the game 22–23.
The playoff venture ended in the Wildcard round, going down 62–19 to the Dublin Rebels.

Honours
Shamrock Bowl I Winners - 1986
Shamrock Bowl II Finalists - 1987
Shamrock Bowl V Winners - 1990
Shamrock Bowl VII Winners - 1992
IAFL DV8 Champions - 2009
IAFA Junior League Champions - 2014
IAFA Junior League Champions - 2015
Emerald Bowl II Champions - 2016
IAFA Junior Champions - 2016
IAFL 1 Bowl Finalists - 2017
IAFL 1 Bowl Finalists - 2018
Emerald Bowl V Champions - 2018

References

External links 
 
 Cowboys Official Website
 Cowboys Twitter Page

American football teams in Northern Ireland
1986 establishments in Northern Ireland
American football teams established in 1986